Lindsley Parsons III is an American television director, television producer and film director.

Parsons is known for such television series and films as The Secret Life of the American Teenager, 7th Heaven, Thirtysomething, SeaQuest DSV, and Beyond the Poseidon Adventure.

References

External links

American television producers
American television directors
American film directors
1955 births
Living people